USS Urgent (ARS-48), a , was scheduled to be built at Napa, California, by the Basalt Rock Co., Inc.; but the end of the war in the Pacific removed the need for the ship. Accordingly, the contract for building the vessel was terminated on 12 August 1945.

References 

 

Bolster-class rescue and salvage ships
Cancelled ships of the United States Navy